

Champions
World Series: Chicago Cubs over Detroit Tigers (4–1)
Southern Association: Nashville Vols over New Orleans Pelicans (1–0)

Statistical leaders

Major league baseball final standings

American League final standings

National League final standings

Events

January–March
February 27 – The sacrifice fly rule is adopted. No time at bat is charged if a run scores after the catch of a fly ball.

April–June
June 30 – Cy Young pitches the third, and final, no-hitter of his career as the Boston Red Sox defeat the New York Highlanders, 8–0.

July–September
July 4 – One batter away from a perfect game, New York Giants pitcher Hooks Wiltse hits George McQuillan with two outs in the ninth inning.  Wiltse continues to pitch and tosses a no-hitter against the Philadelphia Phillies.  The Giants win, 1–0, in 10 innings.
August 4 – In a game between the St. Louis Cardinals and the Brooklyn Superbas only one baseball was used for the entire game. Brooklyn wins, 3–0.
September 5 – Nap Rucker pitches a no-hitter as the Brooklyn Superbas defeat the Boston Doves, 6–0.
September 18 – Cleveland Naps pitcher Bob Rhoads tosses a no-hitter against the Boston Red Sox, Cleveland wins, 2–1.
September 20 – Frank Smith of the Chicago White Sox throws a no-hitter against the Philadelphia Athletics, the White Sox win, 1–0.  It is the second no-hitter of Smith's career.
September 23 – The Chicago Cubs and New York Giants, involved in a tight pennant race, (also involving the Pittsburgh Pirates) were tied in the bottom of the ninth inning at the Polo Grounds. The Giants had runners on first and third and two outs when Al Bridwell hit a single to center field, scoring Moose McCormick from third with the Giants’ apparent winning run, but the runner on first base, rookie Fred Merkle, thinking the game was over, went half way to second and then sprinted to the clubhouse after McCormick touched home plate.  As fans swarmed the field, Cub infielder Johnny Evers retrieved the ball and touched second.  A forceout was called at second base, nullifying the single, and since there were 2 outs when the play started, the run was also nullified and the inning ended.  The game was declared a tie and would be made up at the end of the season if the Cubs and Giants were tied for first place.  The incident became known as "Merkle's Boner".
September 26 – Ed Reulbach of the Chicago Cubs pitches two shutouts in the same day, whitewashing the Brooklyn Superbas 5–0 on a five-hitter and 3–0 on a three-hitter. The entire doubleheader is played in less than three hours. Reulbach allows five hits in the a.m. game, and is even stingier in the afternoon, yielding three hits and a walk. Kaiser Wilhelm and Jim Pastorius are the losing pitchers.

October–December
October 2
In a game involving the Cleveland Naps and the Chicago White Sox, Ed Walsh struck out 15 Naps and walked one batter, pitching a complete game, but it was not enough as Addie Joss pitched a perfect game, as the Naps beat the White Sox, 1–0, during the heat of a pennant race. Cleveland center fielder Joe Birmingham scored the game's only run.  Joss' perfect game is the second in the modern era and fourth all time.  It is perhaps the finest pitching duel in baseball history.
Washington Senators outfielder Otis Clymer hits for the cycle in a 12–2 Washington victory over the New York Highlanders.
October 6 – The Detroit Tigers defeat the Chicago White Sox, 7–0, to win the American League pennant on the last day of the season.
October 8 – The Chicago Cubs defeat the New York Giants, 4–2, in the make-up of "The Merkle's Boner" game, giving the Cubs the National League pennant.
October 14 – The Chicago Cubs defeat the Detroit Tigers, 2–0, in Game 5 of the World Series to win the series four games to one.  It is the second consecutive World Championship for the Cubs and the second year in a row they have defeated the Tigers in the World Series.  The Cubs did not win another World Series until 2016, when they defeated Cleveland Indians in seven games, this ended its 108 year championship drought.
October 14 – The baseball season of 1908 ends with the lowest runs per game average in major league baseball history at 3.38. This outcome was likely an important factor in the decision to trial a livelier "cork center" ball in both leagues the following season.
October 24 – "Take Me Out to the Ball Game" is introduced by singer Billy Murray. The songwriting team of Albert Von Tilzer (music) and Jack Norworth (lyrics) who created the immortal tune have never seen a game. Over the past 100 years, more than 400 musicians from every conceivable genre have recorded the song.
November 22 – In the first game ever between a Japanese and an American professional team, the Reach All-Americans defeat Waseda University in Tokyo, 5 – 0.

Births

January
January 4 – George Selkirk
January 5 – Regis Leheny
January 13 – Jimmy Jordan
January 16 – Johnny Watson
January 17 – Les Willis

February
February 1 – Vince Barton
February 2 – Bobby Coombs
February 2 – Wes Ferrell
February 4 – Hank Garrity
February 9 – Buzz Boyle
February 13 – Gilly Campbell
February 14 – Oscar Judd
February 17 – Red Barber
February 23 – Ray Brown
February 23 – Bob Boken
February 25 – Al Hollingsworth

March
March 1 – Tadashi Wakabayashi
March 2 – Orville Armbrust
March 7 – Harry Davis
March 9 – Myril Hoag
March 12 – Bob Barr
March 13 – Harlin Pool
March 19 – Gee Walker
March 29 – Gibby Brack
March 29 – Bill Strickland

April
April 6 – Dick Gyselman
April 6 – Ernie Lombardi
April 6 – Joe Mowry
April 7 – George Hockette
April 8 – Buck Fausett
April 12 – Joe Vitelli
April 16 – Babe Phelps
April 18 – Ed Boland
April 22 – Fabian Kowalik

May
May 5 – Tony Freitas
May 6 – Jack Owens
May 9 – Billy Jurges
May 17 – Leo Norris
May 25 – Howard Craghead
May 27 – Euel Moore

June
June 4 – Orville Jorgens
June 4 – Bob Klinger
June 6 – Izzy Goldstein
June 9 – Paul Gregory
June 10 – Mike Kreevich
June 19 – Bill Swift
June 20 – Billy Werber
June 22 – Harry Rosenberg
June 25 – Joe Becker

July
July 6 – Cy Blanton
July 14 – Johnny Murphy
July 15 – Jake Powell
July 16 – Floyd Newkirk
July 17 – Ed Connolly
July 20 – Ed Madjeski
July 23 – Ival Goodman
July 30 – Frankie Pytlak

August
August  7 – Clyde Hatter
August 8 – Bo Briggery
August 10 – Odell Hale
August 10 – Bill Trotter
August 15 – Bernie Walter
August 16 – Andy Bednar
August 18 – Jim Peterson
August 20 – Al López
August 28 – Don Savidge

September
September 2 – Monte Pearson
September 12 – Jim McLeod
September 13 – Otho Nitcholas
September 14 – John Bottarini
September 16 – Buster Mills
September 18 – Lefty Guise
September 20 – Zeke Bonura
September 20 – Eddie Hurley
September 22 – Jim Holloway
September 28 – Carl Sumner

October
October 2 – Ray Lucas
October 6 – Tom Padden
October 12 – Johnny Markham
October 15 – Hugo Klaerner
October 17 – Red Rolfe
October 18 – Andy Spognardi
October 24 – Ralph Onis

November
November 3 – Red Phillips
November 5 – Ralph Birkofer
November 8 – John Stoneham
November 9 – Roy Schalk
November 13 – John Kroner
November 19 – Harley Boss
November 19 – Joe Glenn
November 21 – Paul Richards
November 26 – Lefty Gomez
November 29 – Pat Simmons

December
December 1 – Les Munns
December 10 – Earl Cook
December 12 – Flea Clifton
December 14 – Terry Lyons
December 16 – Emil Mailho
December 18 – Jimmy Pattison
December 20 – Art McLarney
December 22 – Ed Fallenstein
December 23 – Sol Carter
December 25 – Ben Chapman
December 25 – Alta Cohen
December 25 – Jo-Jo Moore

Deaths

January–April
 January 14 – Sim Bullas, 45, outfielder for the 1884 Toledo Blue Stockings.
 January 14 – Henry Krug, 41, utility for the 1902 Philadelphia Phillies.
 February 6 – Samuel F. Angus, 52, owner of the Detroit Tigers from November 1901 to October 1903.
 February 20 – Wallace Terry, 57, first baseman/outfielder for the 1875 Washington Nationals.
 March 12 – Fred Ketcham, 32,  outfielder for the Louisville Colonels (1899) and Philadelphia Athletics (1901).
 March 27 – Forrest Crawford, 26, shortstop who played 1906 through 1907 for the St. Louis Cardinals.
 March 30 – Charlie Sweasy, 60, second baseman for 1869 Cincinnati Red Stockings. Played seven years in the National Association and the National League.
 April 6 – Jim Brown, 47, pitcher and outfielder for two seasons, 1884 and 1886.
 April 10 – Mike Griffin, 43, center fielder for Baltimore and Brooklyn who batted .300 six times, scored 100 runs ten times; led league in runs and doubles once each.
 April 13 – John Kelly, 49, 19th century catcher, manager and umpire.
 April 20 – Henry Chadwick, 83, the "Father of Baseball", who through his writings, analysis of statistics and service in developing the sport's rules played a principal role in establishing baseball as the "national pastime"; devised the box score, developed scoring system which enabled recording of every play, authored the first rule book in 1858, and created statistics including batting average and earned run average; worked to revise sport's rules so as to balance offense and defense, and to increase mental demands as well as physical ones.

May–August
May 9 – Charlie Nyce, 37, shortstop for the 1895 Boston Beaneaters.
May 14 – John O'Connell, 35, played in only the 1891 and 1902 seasons.
May 24 – Pete Hasney, 43, played for the 1890 Philadelphia Athletics of the American Association.
June 16 – Ned Garvin, 34, pitcher who posted a 57–97 record and a 2.72 ERA for five different teams between 1896 and 1904.
June 22 – Everett Mills, 63, first baseman for six seasons, 1871–1876.
June 23 – Bill Traffley, 38, catcher for the 1878 Chicago White Stockings.
July 18 – John Brown, 31, pitcher for the 1897 Brooklyn Bridegrooms.
July 22 – Andy Sommers, 42, catcher who played with six clubs from 1897 to 1890.
August 19 – Doc Bushong, 51, catcher for 13 seasons (1875–1876, 1880–1890), who played on five league championship teams.
August 20 – Marty Honan, 39, catcher for the 1891 Chicago Colts of the National League.
August 24 – George Meister, 44, German third baseman who hit .194 in 34 games for the 1884 Toledo Blue Stockings.

September–December
September 7 – Bill Morgan, 52, outfielder and shortstop who played with the Pittsburgh Alleghenys (1883) and Washington Nationals (1884).
September 14 – Ike Van Zandt, 32, outfielder and pitcher who played for the New York Giants (1901), Chicago Cubs (1904) and St. Louis Browns (1905).
September 18 – Dickey Pearce, 72, shortstop (in the sport's earliest era) whose career spanned the years 1856 to 1877; introduced the bunt and pioneered defensive play at his position, later became an umpire.
September 28 – Tom Pratt, 64, played at first base for one game with the 1871 Philadelphia Athletics.
November 5 – Pat Hannivan, 42, outfielder and second baseman for the  1897 Brooklyn Bridegrooms.
December 8 – Frank Griffith, 36, pitcher for the Chicago Cubs (1892) and Cleveland Spiders (1894).
December 10 – Wild Bill Widner, 41, pitcher who posted a 22–36 record and a 4.36 ERA with the Red Stockings, Nationals, Solons and Kelly's Killers from 1887 to 1891.
December 19 – Reddy Foster, 44, pinch hitter for the 1896 New York Giants.
December 26 – Charlie Householder, 52, third baseman/left fielder/shortstop who hit .239 in 83 games for the 1884 Chicago/Pittsburgh team of the Union Association.
December 26 – Shadow Pyle, 47, pitcher for the Philadelphia Quakers (1884) and Chicago White Stockings (1887).

Bibliography